Bertram Stapleton (born 19 October 1970) is a Vincentian cricketer. He played in three first-class and seven List A matches for the Windward Islands from 1994 to 2003.

See also
 List of Windward Islands first-class cricketers

References

External links
 

1970 births
Living people
Saint Vincent and the Grenadines cricketers
Windward Islands cricketers